William of Binning or William of Binin was a 13th-century Cistercian monk. His name indicates that he came from Binning, in Uphall parish, West Lothian, Scotland; otherwise, his background is obscure. He emerges on 29 November 1243 when he is styled "Prior of Newbattle" (deputy Abbot of Newbattle) and elected to be Abbot of Coupar Angus. According to Alexander Myln's 16th century Vitae Dunkeldensis ecclesiae episcoporum ("Lives of the Bishops of Dunkeld"), when William was at Newbattle Abbey he authored a vita (that is, a biography) of John the Scot (died 1203), successively Bishop of Dunkeld and Bishop of St Andrews. The vita has failed to survive. William resigned his position as Abbot of Coupar Angus on 29 September 1258. He died at an unknown date afterwards.

Notes

References
 Duncan, A. A. M., "Binning , William of (d. in or after 1258)", in the Oxford Dictionary of National Biography, Oxford University Press, 2004 , retrieved 16 Feb 2007
 Watt, D. E. R. & Shead, N.F. (eds.), The Heads of Religious Houses in Scotland from the 12th to the 16th Centuries, The Scottish Records Society, New Series, Volume 24, (Edinburgh, 2001)

13th-century deaths
Scottish Cistercians
13th-century Scottish writers
People from West Lothian
Scottish abbots
Scottish biographers
13th-century Scottish Roman Catholic priests
Year of birth unknown